is a former Nippon Professional Baseball pitcher for the Tohoku Rakuten Golden Eagles in Japan's Pacific League.

External links

Living people
1981 births
People from Chiba (city)
Baseball people from Chiba Prefecture
Japanese baseball players
Yakult Swallows players
Tokyo Yakult Swallows players
Tohoku Rakuten Golden Eagles players
Nippon Professional Baseball Rookie of the Year Award winners